Titanium(IV) acetate or titanium tetraacetate is a hypothetical coordination complex with the formula Ti(C2H3O2)4. It is discussed in archaic literature, well before the advent of X-ray crystallography and an appreciation of the structural trends in metal carboxylate complexes.

Related titanium acetates
Evidence for the composition much less the structure as a tetraacetate has not been presented. Instead a variety of titanium oxo acetates have been prepared by reactions of titanium alkoxides and acetic acid.

Uses
Species claimed to be titanium(IV) acetate have been used in the production of bismuth titanate ferroelectric thin films. Titanium(IV) acetate is used in the step of making the acetate-derived solutions. The acetate derived solutions were created by blending acetic acid and bismuth acetate together and adding titanium(IV) acetate. "Titanium(IV) acetate" is a substitute for antimony potassium tartrate(emetic tartar) when making red and brown dyes.

References

Titanium(IV) compounds
Acetates